Tirupati Group Limited (TGL) is a privately owned real estate development and construction company in Uganda. Tirupati Group Limited provides development funding and also constructs its own buildings.

History
The company was established in 2006.

In 2010, Tirupati was recognized for ‘Introduction of a Novel And Competitive Product In East African Region’, during the 16th Annual Investor of the Year Award Ceremony held by the Uganda Investment Authority. It was in regard to Tirupati's Ovino Market, in Kisenyi, Kampala.

In June 2014, TGL won a contract to upgrade and renovate Masaka Regional Referral Hospital for approximately US$4 million (USh:10.6 billion).

Scope of work
 the following real estate projects have either been completed or are in development by the company:

Subsidiary companies
In addition to developing and constructing real estate projects, TGL has several non-real-estate related subsidiaries.
 
Bio-Waste Management Limited collects and disposes of biomedical and pharmaceutical waste in an environmentally friendly and safe manner.

Crops on this demonstration farm include pineapples, maize and onions. It is located in Kayunga District.

See also
 List of conglomerates in Uganda
 List of conglomerates in Africa
 Kampala Capital City Authority
 Miraj Barot
 List of wealthiest people in Uganda

References

External links
 Tirupati Group Limited

Real estate companies of Uganda
Conglomerate companies of Uganda
Kampala District
Conglomerate companies established in 2006
2006 establishments in Uganda
Construction and civil engineering companies of Uganda